The Te Mihi Power Station is a 166 MW geothermal power station owned and operated by Contact Energy, located north of Taupo in New Zealand.

The resource consent for the power station was "called in" by the Minister for the Environment Trevor Mallard under the terms of the Resource Management Act. The appointed Board of Enquiry granted the consent with a set of stipulated conditions.

Te Mihi Power Station uses geothermal energy from the Wairakei geothermal field, which lies in the Taupo Volcanic Zone.  It is part of a plan to gradually replace the Wairakei Power Station which will be phased out of production.  With Te Mihi in operation, output from Wairakei is decreased by approximately 45 MW, resulting in a net increase of about 114 MW.

The project was designed and constructed by a joint venture of McConnell Dowell, SNC-Lavalin and Parsons Brinckerhoff.  The plant includes two 83 MW steam turbines supplied by Toshiba. The project cost $623 million and was officially opened in August 2014.

See also

 Geothermal power in New Zealand
 List of power stations in New Zealand

References

External links

Energy infrastructure completed in 2014
Geothermal power stations in New Zealand
Taupō District
Buildings and structures in the Taupo District
2014 establishments in New Zealand